Louisa Frances Bassano (19 February 1818 – 20 August 1908) was an English opera singer.

She was the second daughter of Clemente Bassano and elder sister of the photographer Alexander Bassano. She toured with the pianist Franz Liszt during his visit to the British Isles in 1840-1841. Bassano sang the mezzo recitatives in the first English performance of Mendelssohn's Elijah conducted by the composer. She was known as Miss Bassano until she married Frederick George Boddy Esq. in 1849, from which time she became known as Madame Bassano. Her husband died in 1853. She later taught singing and was a member of the Royal Society of Musicians.

External links
Franz Liszt concert programme for September 16, 1840 at The Centre for Performance History
Liszt in Limerick, The Old Limerick Journal, Richard Ahern

1818 births
1908 deaths
Alumni of the Royal Academy of Music
English people of Italian descent
English opera singers
Women of the Victorian era
Italian British musicians
19th-century British actresses
British stage actresses
19th-century English musicians